Beaufort Lake is a small lake located south east of southern end of Comox Lake.  This lake is a widening of Beaufort Creek, which in turn takes its name from the Beaufort Range.

References

Alberni Valley
Lakes of Vancouver Island
Nelson Land District